The Yemeni Navy and Coastal Defence Forces is the maritime component of the armed forces of Yemen.
Yemen's navy was created in 1990 when North and South Yemen united. 

Yemen early on had problems with trying to keep drugs from entering Yemen by sea. In 2006, Yemen purchased 10 Bay-class patrol boats which were very effective at stopping smugglers from entering Yemen.
The Bay patrol craft currently under construction are, however, for the Yemeni Coast Guard, not the Yemeni Navy. Likewise, the 10 Austal Patrol Craft belong to the Coast Guard, not the Navy.

In the Hanish Islands Crisis, Yemen prepared its navy for an assault on the Hanish Islands and on Eritrea. Eritrea accidentally destroyed a Russian ship, thinking it was a Yemeni ship. The invasion, however, never happened since Eritrea made agreements with Yemen.

History

1990 merger
In 1990, on the Yemeni unification, the Navy of South Yemen was merged into the Navy of North Yemen. Of the 11,000 sailors/seamen and 2,700 officers in the PDRY Navy, half were forced into compulsory retirement. The South Yemeni Navy also consisted of 5 Osa class missile boats, 8 T43-class minesweepers and 1 Ropucha-class landing ship, all of which were transferred to the Yemeni Navy.

Yemen early on had problems with trying to keep drugs from entering Yemen by sea. In 2006, Yemen purchased 10 Bay-class patrol boats which were very effective at stopping smugglers from entering Yemen. The Bay patrol craft currently under construction are, however, for the Yemeni Coast Guard, not the Yemeni Navy. Likewise, the 10 Austal Patrol Craft belong to the Coast Guard, not the Navy. The navy's major bases are located in Aden and Al Hudaydah. There are also bases on Socotra, Al Mukalla and Perim island, which maintain naval support equipment. There is also a naval fortress under construction in Al Hudaydah.
In the Hanish Islands Crisis, Yemen prepared its navy for an assault on the Hanish Islands and on Eritrea. Eritrea accidentally destroyed a Russian ship, thinking it was a Yemeni ship. The invasion, however, never happened since Eritrea made agreements with Yemen which involved Eritrea taking over the islands. Yemen, however, later took over Zuqar Island, which created further tensions with the Eritrean government but did not lead to another war.

Yemeni Civil War

Since the outbreak of the civil war in Yemen in March 2015, at least some elements of the Navy are known to have sided with the Houthi-dominated Supreme Revolutionary Committee and the loyalists of former President Ali Abdullah Saleh. The Yemeni Navy issued a statement in October 2016 that any Saudi ships intruding in Yemen's territorial waters would be destroyed. The Yemeni Navy reportedly attacked two Saudi warships and the Emirati HSV-2 Swift off the Red Sea coast. Because of this, the Royal Saudi Air Force attacked the naval base at Al Hudaydah and destroyed two of Yemen's three Chinese made fast missile craft. The Yemeni Navy, allegedly supported by Iranian advisors, repaired and smuggled Noor anti-ship cruise missiles and their launchers and coupled them with maritime radars and they were used to target coalition ships. The Noor missile or the original C-802 were named "Al Mandab-1", claiming it as an original Yemeni design and production. The Saudi tanker ship Boraida was targeted without reporting damage. In October 2016, with US Navy vessels patrolling the area in support to their Saudi allies, Yemeni forces fired about a dozen cruise missiles at them on three different days. In response, the USS Nitze launched five Tomahawk cruise missiles and knocked out three Yemeni maritime radar sites. The Saudi Air force also flew  airstrikes and destroyed another Yemeni Radar station. Since then, lacking shore based battery radars, the Yemeni Navy begun deploying speedboats and the remaining fast missile craft to approximately track Saudi coalition shipping.

Naval Equipment

References

Military of Yemen
Navies by country